Wilkowo may refer to the following places in Poland:
Wilkowo, Lower Silesian Voivodeship (south-west Poland)
Wilkowo, Kuyavian-Pomeranian Voivodeship (north-central Poland)
Wilkowo, Masovian Voivodeship (east-central Poland)
Wilkowo, Greater Poland Voivodeship (west-central Poland)
Wilkowo, Lubusz Voivodeship (west Poland)
Wilkowo, Człuchów County in Pomeranian Voivodeship (north Poland)
Wilkowo, Kwidzyn County in Pomeranian Voivodeship (north Poland)
Wilkowo, Elbląg County in Warmian-Masurian Voivodeship (north Poland)
Wilkowo, Kętrzyn County in Warmian-Masurian Voivodeship (north Poland)
Wilkowo, Olsztyn County in Warmian-Masurian Voivodeship (north Poland)
Wilkowo, Węgorzewo County in Warmian-Masurian Voivodeship (north Poland)